Swimply is an online marketplace for renting a private swimming pool. Homeowners with swimming pools can offer said pool for hourly rentals to individuals or groups. Reservations are made via the Swimply mobile app for Android or iPhone or via the company's website. Communication, selection of amenities, and payment are all handled through the Swimply platform. Hosts in the United States are covered by a $1,000,000 insurance policy. Swimply currently operates in the United States, Canada, and Australia.

History 
Founder Bunim Laskin came up with the idea for the app at the age of 20, after noticing a neighbor's pool which was rarely in use. He rented their pool in exchange for assistance paying for the pool's upkeep. He then realized that he might have a scalable business plan and began finding other neighbor's pools using Google Earth's satellite photos. Launching as Swimply (swimming and simply), he soon had over 30 pools listed, 400 reservations and was featured on MSNBC. By the end of the year he dropped out of college to pursue the business full-time.

In November 2019, Swimply expanded to Australia.

Laskin appeared on a March 13, 2020 episode of Shark Tank pitching an investment opportunity in his company. All Sharks declined. Asher Weinberger (COO) later said the Sharks declined his offer partly due to the pandemic and the country going into lockdown.

Swimply gained traction during the pandemic as many sought safe ways to travel and socialize outdoors with friends and family.

Funding and revenue  
Laskin received $30,000 from family and friends, followed by $1,200,000 in an initial seed round. Another round of funding fell through due to the COVID-19 pandemic, but the company did see a 4000% increase in revenue during 2020. In 2021, Swimply closed a $10 million Series A round in 2021 lead by Norwest Venture Partners.

The round was followed on by Trust Ventures and other notable angels, including Poshmark CEO Manish Chandra and Ancestry.com CEO Debora Liu.

Swimply follows a similar model to Airbnb, receiving a 15% commission from the rental price and an additional 10% fee charged to the guests. Hourly rentals are in the range of $20 to $150 an hour.

Liability 
As of 2021 Swimply provides a $1,000,000 liability insurance policy and $10,000 of property protection for hosts inside the United States. Swimply requires pool owners to have their pools inspected for health and safety including inspection of tiles and chlorine levels.

References

Renting
Swimming pools
Sharing economy
Service companies of the United States
American companies established in 2019